James A Bartram (1826/27–1905) was a leading pioneer in the Western Australian town of Beverley.

Early life

Bartram was born in the village of Aylmerton (in the parish of Erpingham) in Norfolk, England. He was the son of William John Bartram of Aylmerton and Ann Jane Strange. His mother Ann Strange (sister of Richard Strange) was a descendant of the Dukes of Atholl on the wrong side of the blanket. His mother died when he was young and his father died when he was 15. Bartram was one of seven children. His grandmother Lady Bartram was an Italian Jew who his grandfather met in Italy when he was visiting his Bartram relatives in Civita Vecchia. Their cousin Richard Bartram was the English Consul there.

The above information needs some real referencing - rambling blog posts without references does not a reference make.

In Australia 

In 1843 Bartram  at the age of 16 went with his relative Thomas Carter to Western Australia. He firstly worked for Carter at his Merrow Farm Inn - the half way house between Guildford near Perth and York. He later became a leading farmer in Beverley as well as the Justice of the Peace and postman. He also assisted the presentation Catholic nuns in Beverley even though he wasn't a Catholic. He returned to visit England in 1858 and brought back farm equipment including the first wheat stripper in the Beverley district. Bartram also was the first miller in the district, and built the first police station in Beverley in 1861. Bartram may have brought his horse drawn mill from England. 

Bartram and George Kersley, Sr. firstly leased Avon Dale from Nicholas Carey in 1844 (August 15) when Bartram  was only 17. Carey had first come to Perth in 1835 and he returned to visit England in 1841 where he may have met Bartram through Carter who was also visiting England at this time. Carey, Carter and Bartram all returned together on the Janet in 1843. One document about the Avon Dale research station states:

Today this property is the Avondale Agricultural Research Station.

Bartram farmed at Avon Dale and Emerald Hills. He had a secret Jewish wedding ceremony in 1847 to Jane Ann Williams (born 1830) the daughter of Thomas Williams of Kilmagig Wicklow, Ireland and Eliza Leason (Pollard) of Safed, Palestine. They legally married in 1851 in a registry office. They had eight children - two sons and six daughters. His son Henry Bartram was a leading pioneer of the area around Lake Dumbleyung. His younger son John Robert Bartram remained in the Beverley district and farmed Emerald Hills and married his relative Julia Sophia Strange. Bartram went bankrupt at one stage. He died in Beverley in 1905 as a revered pioneer of the district.

References

People from Beverley, Western Australia
Year of birth uncertain
1905 deaths